Boloso Bombe is one of the woredas in the Southern Nations, Nationalities, and Peoples' Region of Ethiopia part of the Wolayita Zone. Boloso Bombe is bordered on the south by Kindo Koysha, on the west by the Dawro Zone, on the north by the Kembata Tembaro Zone, on the east by Boloso Sore, and on the southeast by Damot Sore. The administrative center of this woreda is Bombe, which has a latitude and longitude of 7°08′15.1"N 37° 34'54.1"E.

Demographics 
Based on the 2019 population projection conducted by the CSA, this woreda has a total population of 109,789, of whom 53,460 are men and 56,329 women; 1,057 or 1.2% of its population are urban dwellers. The majority of the inhabitants were Protestants, with 69.27% of the population reporting that belief, 26.86% practiced Ethiopian Orthodox Christianity, and 1.26% were Catholic.

Notes

Wolayita
Districts of the Southern Nations, Nationalities, and Peoples' Region